{{Infobox video game
| image     = Crashmo logo.jpg
| caption   = Crashmos official logo
| developer = Intelligent Systems
| publisher = Nintendo
| director  = Taku SugiokaMisuzu Yoshida
| producer  = Toshio SengokuNaoki NakanoShinya TakahashiKensuke TanabeKeisuke Terasaki
| artist    = Narumi Kubota
| composer  = Shoh Murakami
| platforms = Nintendo 3DS
| released  = 
| genre     = Puzzle
| modes     = Single-player
The game is a sequel to Pushmo and was released in Japan on October 31, 2012, in the PAL regions on November 15, 2012, and in North America on November 22, 2012.

In Crashmo, players controls Mallo who goes across the Crashmo Park and solve Crashmos at a request.
The game received praise for its graphics and new features, although its high level of difficulty received mixed opinions. Two sequels, Pushmo World for the Wii U and Stretchmo for the Nintendo 3DS, were released in 2014 and 2015 respectively.

 Plot and setting Crashmo is set in the titular Crashmo Park where numerous puzzles, the Crashmos, are set across the park. The park consists of four main areas, the park, which serves as the story mode; the sand castle where Papa Blox explains the game's mechanics; the training area; and the Crashmo Studio, a pencil-shaped studio where Crashmos are created. Crashmo begins when Mallo arrives at the Crashmo Park and encounters Poppy, Papa Blox's niece, in her "Bird Balloon" set with 100 birds. However, Mallo accidentally scares all the birds who flies away across all over the park. Mallo then spends all the day saving the birds over the park; on evening, Mallo and Poppy departs aboard her Bird Balloon. The next day, Papa Blox presents to Mallo the Special Challenges; after finishing them, Papa Blox encourages the player to come back anytime and use the Crashmo Studio.

 Gameplay 

The gameplay is similar to its predecessor. The player controls Mallo as he jumps and interacts with the puzzles in order to climb it and reach the goal. However, the player can now control the camera to freely move around the puzzles. The puzzles also have gravity and puzzle pieces fall when there is no support.

By progressing, the player unlocks various other areas, such as the Crashmo Studio, where the player can create their own Crashmo and share it via QR codes.

 Reception Crashmo received "generally favorable reviews" according to the review aggregation website Metacritic. Critics generally praised the graphics, music and gameplay, though its high difficulty for new players was criticized.Eurogamers Christian Donlan said: "Fallblox is yet another Intelligent Systems game that seems to truly know its place in the world: it's happy to be a smart little download treat that comes alive for a few minutes every night before bed." Edge Nathan Brown said of the game, "For tenacious players and those inclined towards the genre, Fallblox could prove an irresistible draw, with clearing its parade of cryptic conundrums a delicious prospect. For others, the game's difficulty, and its visual and thematic linearity, will prove tiresome, their enthusiasm for its self-evident ingenuity petering out before each of its challenges has fallen."

Audrey Drake of IGN described the game as "amazing" and a "must download" for 3DS owners. She was surprised to see Pushmo'', a game she already held in high regard, improved. Drake had high praise for the "clever" gameplay, high difficulty, character and environment design, and camera controls. Her one criticism was that the high difficulty could scare off new players.

Notes

References

External links 
 
 

2012 video games
Intelligent Systems games
Nintendo games
Nintendo 3DS eShop games
Nintendo 3DS games
Nintendo 3DS-only games
Puzzle video games
Single-player video games
Video game sequels
Video games developed in Japan